Scharnegoutum is a village in Súdwest Fryslân in the province of Friesland, the Netherlands. It had a population of around 1,660 in January 2017.

History
Scharnegoutum is built upon a man-made hill (called a terp in Dutch).  During excavations of the hill objects from the 4th century were found. The village was at one time beside the Middelzee until this was drained in about 1300. In the Middle Ages Scharnegoutum possessed a covenant, similar to the situation in the villages Loaiïngea, Goaiïngea, Gau, and Offingawier.  
Scharnegoutum had a train station from 1883 until 1938, on the railway line Leeuwarden - Stavoren. On June 1, 1940 the station reopened, but on November 24 of that year it closed again. In 1897, the Dairy Cooperative factory Scharnegoutum was founded. In 1972 this factory was closed. Before 2011, the village was part of the Wymbritseradiel municipality.

Population 
 1954 - 1,031
 1959 - 1,002
 1964 - 955
 1969 - 1.020
 1974 - 996
 2006 - 1,677

Gallery

References

External links

 Website Scharnegoutum

Súdwest-Fryslân
Populated places in Friesland